Bakevelliidae is an extinct family of prehistoric bivalves that lived from the Late Mississippian until the Middle Eocene.  Bakevelliidae species are found worldwide, excluding Antarctica.  Living a stationary life attached to substrate in marine and brackish environments, they formed shells of an aragonite composition with a low amount of magnesium calcite.  The family was named by King in 1850.  At least one genus in the family, Hoernesia, has a notably twisted commissure join.

Morphology
Generally the family consists of species with elongate shells with notably unequal valves.  Some of the genera have lost the small anterior auricle but all lack a byssal notch.  The shell structuring consists of a regular prismatic calcitic outer layer and an interior layering which is nacreous.  The valve surfaces show multiple pits where the valve ligaments were attached.  The valve dentition generally consisted of a series of short, transverse teeth along the anterior edge and a few more elongated teeth along the sides.  Shells of the included genera range from having radial sculpturing to not having any radial sculpture.  Several of the species have an early growth period in which the valve ligament is anchored in a single pit in the shell.  When the species size exceeded approximately  the ligament attachment would develop to encompass two or more pits.  One possible species of Bakevelliid from the early Triassic of Utah is tentatively included in the genus Bakevellia but is noted for having an adult shell with only one ligament attachment pit, contrary to the normal state of the rest of the family.

Taxonomy
Taxonomy taken from The Paleobiology Database.

Bakevelliidae King, 1850
Genus Aguilerella Chavan, 1951
Genus Aguileria White, 1887
Genus Bakevellia King, 1848
Subgenus Bakevellia (Bakevellia) King, 1848
Subgenus Bakevellia (Boreiobakevellia) Kurushin, 1980
Subgenus Bakevellia (Maizuria) Nakazawa, 1959
Subgenus Bakevellia (Neobakevellia) Nakazawa, 1959
Genus Cassiavellia Tëmkin & Pojeta, Jr., 2010
Genus Costigervillia Cox, 1948
Genus Cultriopsis 
Genus Cuneigervillia Cox, 1954
Genus Gervillaria Cox, 1951
Genus Gervillella Waagen, 1907
Genus Gervillia Defrance, 1820
Subgenus Gervillia (Cultriopsis) Cossman, 1904
Subgenus Gervillia (Gervillia) Defrance, 1820
Genus Gervilliopsis Whitfield, 1885
Genus Hoernesia 
Subgenus Hoernesia (Strophopteria) Guo, 1985
Genus Kedonella Polubotko, 1992
Genus Kobayashites Hayami, 1959
Genus Marmaronia Larghi, 200
Genus Panis Stephenson, 1953
Genus Permoperna (Nakazawa & Newell, 1968)
Genus Pseudoptera Meek, 1873
Genus Tenuipteria Stephenson, 1955
Genus Towapteria Nakazawa & Newell, 1968

References

 
Prehistoric bivalve families
Mississippian first appearances
Bartonian extinctions